Gigel Bogdan Ene (born 4 September 1982) is a Romanian former professional soccer player.

References 
 
 
 

1982 births
Living people
Footballers from Bucharest
Romanian footballers
Association football midfielders
Liga I players
Liga II players
ACF Gloria Bistrița players
CSM Ceahlăul Piatra Neamț players
SCM Râmnicu Vâlcea players
ASC Daco-Getica București players
AS Voința Snagov players